Raskens is a 1927 novel by Swedish writer Vilhelm Moberg. The story takes place in the 19th century and is about Gustav Rask, a peasant who becomes a soldier in the Swedish allotment system.  

It was made into a successful TV mini-series in 1976, starring Sven Wollter and Gurie Nordwall.

References

External links 

1927 novels
Novels by Vilhelm Moberg
Historical novels
Swedish television miniseries
Novels set in Sweden
Novels set in the 19th century
Swedish-language novels